In chemistry, a solution is a special type of homogeneous mixture composed of two or more substances. In such a mixture, a solute is a substance dissolved in another substance, known as a solvent. If the attractive forces between the solvent and solute particles are greater than the attractive forces holding the solute particles together, the solvent particles pull the solute particles apart and surround them. These surrounded solute particles then move away from the solid solute and out into the solution. The mixing process of a solution happens at a scale where the effects of chemical polarity are involved, resulting in interactions that are specific to solvation. The solution usually has the state of the solvent when the solvent is the larger fraction of the mixture, as is commonly the case. One important parameter of a solution is the concentration, which is a measure of the amount of solute in a given amount of solution or solvent. The term "aqueous solution" is used when one of the solvents is water.

Characteristics 
  A solution is a homogeneous mixture of two or more substances.
  The particles of solute in a solution cannot be seen by the naked eye. By contrast, particles may be visible in a suspension.
  A solution does not cause beams of light to scatter. By contrast, the particles in a suspension can cause Tyndall scattering or Rayleigh scattering.
  A solution is stable; solutes will not precipitate unless added in excess of the mixture's solubility, at which point the excess would remain in its solid phase, referred to as hypersaturation.
  The solute from a solution cannot be separated by filtration (or mechanically).
  It is composed of only one phase.

Types 

Homogeneous means that the components of the mixture form a single phase. Heterogeneous means that the components of the mixture are of different phase. The properties of the mixture (such as concentration, temperature, and density) can be uniformly distributed through the volume but only in absence of diffusion phenomena or after their completion. Usually, the substance present in the greatest amount is considered the solvent. Solvents can be gases, liquids, or solids. One or more components present in the solution other than the solvent are called solutes. The solution has the same physical state as the solvent.

Gaseous mixtures 
If the solvent is a gas, only gases (non-condensable) or vapors (condensable) are dissolved under a given set of conditions. An example of a gaseous solution is air (oxygen and other gases dissolved in nitrogen). Since interactions between gaseous molecules play almost no role, non-condensable gases form rather trivial solutions. In the literature, they are not even classified as solutions, but simply addressed as homogeneous mixtures of gases. The Brownian motion and the permanent molecular agitation of gas molecules guarantee the homogeneity of the gaseous systems. Non-condensable gases mixtures (e.g., air/CO2, or air/xenon) do not spontaneously demix, nor sediment, as distinctly stratified and separate gas layers as a function of their relative density. Diffusion forces efficiently counteract gravitation forces under normal conditions prevailing on Earth. The case of condensable vapors is different: once the saturation vapor pressure at a given temperature is reached, vapor excess condenses into the liquid state.

Liquid solutions 
If the solvent is a liquid, then almost all gases, liquids, and solids can be dissolved. Here are some examples:
 Gas in liquid:
 Oxygen in water
 Carbon dioxide in water – a less simple example, because the solution is accompanied by a chemical reaction (formation of ions). The visible bubbles in carbonated water are not the dissolved gas, but only an effervescence of carbon dioxide that has come out of solution; the dissolved gas itself is not visible since it is dissolved on a molecular level.
 Liquid in liquid:
 The mixing of two or more substances of the same chemistry but different concentrations to form a constant. (Homogenization of solutions)
 Alcoholic beverages are basically solutions of ethanol in water.
 Solid in liquid:
 Sucrose (table sugar) in water
 Sodium chloride (NaCl) (table salt) or any other salt in water, which forms an electrolyte: When dissolving, salt dissociates into ions.
 Solutions in water are especially common, and are called aqueous solutions.
 Non-aqueous solutions are when the liquid solvent involved is not water.

Counterexamples are provided by liquid mixtures that are not homogeneous: colloids, suspensions, emulsions are not considered solutions.

Body fluids are examples of complex liquid solutions, containing many solutes. Many of these are electrolytes since they contain solute ions, such as potassium. Furthermore, they contain solute molecules like sugar and urea. Oxygen and carbon dioxide are also essential components of blood chemistry, where significant changes in their concentrations may be a sign of severe illness or injury.

Solid solutions 
If the solvent is a solid, then gases, liquids, and solids can be dissolved.
 Gas in solids:
 Hydrogen dissolves rather well in metals, especially in palladium; this is studied as a means of hydrogen storage.
 Liquid in solid:
 Mercury in gold, forming an amalgam
 Water in solid salt or sugar, forming moist solids
 Hexane in paraffin wax
 Polymers containing plasticizers such as phthalate (liquid) in PVC (solid)
 Solid in solid:
 Steel, basically a solution of carbon atoms in a crystalline matrix of iron atoms 
 Alloys like bronze and many others
 Radium sulfate dissolved in barium sulfate: a true solid solution of Ra in BaSO4

Solubility 

The ability of one compound to dissolve in another compound is called solubility. When a liquid can completely dissolve in another liquid the two liquids are miscible. Two substances that can never mix to form a solution are said to be immiscible.

All solutions have a positive entropy of mixing. The interactions between different molecules or ions may be energetically favored or not. If interactions are unfavorable, then the free energy decreases with increasing solute concentration. At some point, the energy loss outweighs the entropy gain, and no more solute particles can be dissolved; the solution is said to be saturated. However, the point at which a solution can become saturated can change significantly with different environmental factors, such as temperature, pressure, and contamination. For some solute-solvent combinations, a supersaturated solution can be prepared by raising the solubility (for example by increasing the temperature) to dissolve more solute and then lowering it (for example by cooling).

Usually, the greater the temperature of the solvent, the more of a given solid solute it can dissolve. However, most gases and some compounds exhibit solubilities that decrease with increased temperature. Such behavior is a result of an exothermic enthalpy of solution. Some surfactants exhibit this behaviour. The solubility of liquids in liquids is generally less temperature-sensitive than that of solids or gases.

Properties 

The physical properties of compounds such as melting point and boiling point change when other compounds are added. Together they are called colligative properties. There are several ways to quantify the amount of one compound dissolved in the other compounds collectively called concentration. Examples include molarity, volume fraction, and mole fraction.

The properties of ideal solutions can be calculated by the linear combination of the properties of its components. If both solute and solvent exist in equal quantities (such as in a 50% ethanol, 50% water solution), the concepts of "solute" and "solvent" become less relevant, but the substance that is more often used as a solvent is normally designated as the solvent (in this example, water).

Liquid solution characteristics

In principle, all types of liquids can behave as solvents: liquid noble gases, molten metals, molten salts, molten covalent networks, and molecular liquids. In the practice of chemistry and biochemistry, most solvents are molecular liquids. They can be classified into polar and non-polar, according to whether their molecules possess a permanent electric dipole moment. Another distinction is whether their molecules can form hydrogen bonds (protic and aprotic solvents). Water, the most commonly used solvent, is both polar and sustains hydrogen bonds.

Salts dissolve in polar solvents, forming positive and negative ions that are attracted to the negative and positive ends of the solvent molecule, respectively. If the solvent is water, hydration occurs when the charged solute ions become surrounded by water molecules. A standard example is aqueous saltwater. Such solutions are called electrolytes. Whenever salt dissolves in water ion association has to be taken into account.

Polar solutes dissolve in polar solvents, forming polar bonds or hydrogen bonds. As an example, all alcoholic beverages are aqueous solutions of ethanol. On the other hand, non-polar solutes dissolve better in non-polar solvents. Examples are hydrocarbons such as oil and grease that easily mix, while being incompatible with water.

An example of the immiscibility of oil and water is a leak of petroleum from a damaged tanker, that does not dissolve in the ocean water but rather floats on the surface.

Preparation from constituent ingredients 

It is common practice in laboratories to make a solution directly from its constituent ingredients.  There are three cases in practical calculation:
 Case 1: amount of solvent volume is given.
 Case 2: amount of solute mass is given.
 Case 3: amount of final solution volume is given.

In the following equations, A is solvent, B is solute, and C is concentration. Solute volume contribution is considered through the ideal solution model.
 Case 1: amount (mL) of solvent volume VA is given. Solute mass mB = C VA dA /(100-C/dB)
 Case 2: amount of solute mass mB is given. Solvent volume VA = mB (100/C-1/ dB )
 Case 3: amount (mL) of final solution volume Vt is given. Solute mass mB = C Vt /100; Solvent volume VA=(100/C-1/ dB) mB
 Case 2: solute mass is known, VA = mB 100/C
 Case 3: total solution volume is known, same equation as case 1. VA=Vt; mB = C VA /100

Example: Make 2 g/100mL of NaCl solution with 1 L water. The density of the resulting solution is considered to be equal to that of water, statement holding especially for dilute solutions, so the density information is not required.

mB = C VA = ( 2 / 100 ) g/mL × 1000 mL = 20 g

Chemists often make concentrated stock solutions that may then be diluted as needed for laboratory applications. Standard solutions are those where concentrations of solutes are accurately and precisely known.

See also 

 
 
 
  is a common term in a range of disciplines, and can have different meanings depending on the analytical method used. In water quality, it refers to the amount of residue remaining after the evaporation of water from a sample.

References

External links

 
Homogeneous chemical mixtures
Alchemical processes
Physical chemistry
Colloidal chemistry
Drug delivery devices
Dosage forms